Alfred "Freddie" Huber (15 May 1930 – 25 May 1972) was an Austrian tennis and ice hockey player. He began his tennis career in 1946. He won the British Covered Court Championships in 1956. He competed at Wimbledon in 1949–57, but never advanced through the third round. He competed in the hockey tournament at the 1948 Winter Olympics.

References

External links

1930 births
1972 deaths
Austrian ice hockey goaltenders
Austrian male tennis players
Ice hockey players at the 1948 Winter Olympics
Olympic ice hockey players of Austria
Sportspeople from Klagenfurt
Tennis players from Vienna